Eastern Suburbs Rugby Union Football Club may refer to:

Eastern Suburbs RUFC (NSW) Est. 1900
Eastern Suburbs Rugby Union Club Canberra (ACT) Est. 1938
Eastern Suburbs Rugby Union Football Club Inc. (TAS) Est. 1964